Playter is a surname. Notable people with the surname include:

George Playter (1809–1866), Canadian Methodist minister, historian and writer
Wellington A. Playter (1879–1937), English actor

See also
Playter Estates, an area of Toronto, Ontario, Canada
William Playters (1590–1668), English politician